This is a list of State Protected Monuments as officially reported by and available through the website of the Archaeological Survey of India in the Indian state Haryana. The monument identifier is a combination of the abbreviation of the subdivision of the list (state, ASI circle) and the numbering as published on the website of the ASI. 23 State Protected Monuments have been recognized by the ASI in Haryana. Besides the State Protected Monuments, also the Monuments of National Importance in this state might be relevant.

List of state protected monuments 

|}

See also

 Tosham rock inscription
 List of Monuments of National Importance in Haryana
 List of Indus Valley Civilization sites
 List of National Parks & Wildlife Sanctuaries of Haryana, India
 Haryana Tourism

References 

Haryana
 
State Protected Monuments